Philip Hoare (born Patrick Kevin Philip Moore, 1958) is an English writer, especially of history and biography. He instigated the Moby Dick Big Read project. He is Professor of Creative Writing at the University of Southampton and Leverhulme artist-in-residence at the Marine Institute, Plymouth University, which awarded him an honorary doctorate in 2011.

Name
He was born Patrick Moore. He chose the name Philip Hoare to avoid confusion with astronomer Patrick Moore:

Life
Hoare was born in Southampton and attended St Mary's College. He then studied at St Mary's University, Twickenham.

In 1982–83, he ran the record label Operation Twilight, a UK-based subsidiary of the Belgian label Les Disques du Crépuscule, which launched the career of the Pale Fountains. In 2009, he exhibited artworks made with Angela Cockayne at Viktor Wynd Fine Art Inc in London.

Writing career

Philip Hoare was the winner of the 2009 Samuel Johnson Prize, now known as the Baillie Gifford Prize for Non-Fiction, for his work Leviathan, or the Whale. The book, which charts both a personal and societal fascination with whales that approaches the mystical, met critical acclaim. Jonathan Mirsky, writing for Literary Review, praised Hoare's poignancy and awe ("Whales defy gravity, occupy other dimensions; they live in a medium that would overwhelm us, and which far exceeds our earthly sway moving through a world we know nothing about") as well as his ability to draw in the broader significance of whaling to the foundations of American capitalism ("it was as if the antediluvian beasts had to die in order to assert the modern world").

Whales featured in his book RisingTideFallingStar which blended travel, memoir and literary history. The Guardian described it as "a remarkable book that sometimes feels rather loosely fitted together, but is always rich and strange."

Works
Hoare is the author of eleven works of non-fiction:

 Serious Pleasures: The Life of Stephen Tennant (1990). 
 Noël Coward: A Biography (1995)
 Wilde's Last Stand: Decadence, Conspiracy, and the First World War (1997)
 Spike Island: The Memory of a Military Hospital (2000), the story of Netley Hospital in Southampton
 The Ghosts of Netley (2004)
 England's Lost Eden: Adventures in a Victorian Utopia (2005), about Mary Anne Girling and the New Forest Shakers
 Leviathan or, The Whale (2008), which won the 2009 BBC Samuel Johnson Prize for non-fiction
 The Whale: In Search Of The Giants Of The Sea (2010)
 The Sea Inside (2013)
 RisingTideFallingStar (2017)
 Albert and the Whale: Albrecht Dürer and How Art Imagines Our World (2021)

He has also edited The Sayings of Noël Coward (1997).

Hoare has co-authored or contributed to the following publications:

 Essay on the evolution of class in the UK in a British Council pamphlet, Posh: The Evolution of the Traditional British Brand (ed. Sorrel Hershberg, 1999).
 An essay in Linder: Works 1976–2006 (2006), a collection about Linder Sterling.
 Gabriel Orozco (2006), exhibition catalogue and texts, with Mark Godfrey.
 Pet Shop Boys (2006), catalogue and texts, with Chris Heath.
 Introduction to David Austen (2007) (eds. Emma Dean and Michael Stanley).
 Foreword to Made in Southampton (2008), a box-set of prints.
 Provenance (2010), with Angela Cockayne, a response to Wunderkammen.
 Essay, "Something against nothing", in Tania Kovats (2011) (ed. Jeremy Millar).
 Dominion: A Whale Symposium (2012) (eds. Hoare and Angela Cockayne).
 Essay in Malicious Damage: the Defaced Library Books of Kenneth Halliwell and Joe Orton (2013), (ed. Ilsa Colsell).
 Essay in Southampton: A City Lost ... And Found (2013), a collection of drawings by Eric Meadus.
 Record of a discussion between Hoare, Christopher Frayling and Mark Kermode on David Bowie's cultural impact, in David Bowie is the subject (2013) (eds. Victoria Broackes and Geoffrey Marsh).
 Greetings from Darktown : an illustrator's miscellany, a collection of the work of Jonny Hannah, with texts by Hoare, Sheena Calvert and Peter Chrisp (2014).
 Foreword to As is the sea (2014), writing by students from the Royal College of Art (ed. Jessie Bond).
 Another Green World – Linn Botanic Gardens: Encounters with a Scottish Arcadia (2015), photographs by Alison Turnbull, text by Hoare.
———————
Notes

Other projects

He has been interested in cetaceans since early childhood. He wrote and presented the BBC Arena film The Hunt for Moby-Dick, and directed three films for BBC's Whale Night.

Between 2011 and 2012, his self-professed 'whale obsession' led him to create the Moby Dick Big Read. The project, curated by Hoare and artist Angela Cockayne, involved the construction of an online audiobook of all 135 chapters of Herman Melville's classic Moby Dick; or, the Whale. The readings were delivered by a multitude of celebrities, including Tilda Swinton, Stephen Fry, Sir David Attenborough, John Waters, Simon Callow and David Cameron, and accompanied by images from contemporary artists such as Anish Kapoor, Antony Gormley, George Shaw and Susan Hiller. The readings were uploaded to the Moby Dick Big Read website, with one chapter available for download per day from 16 September 2012. All downloads are free but donations are invited to 'Whale and Dolphin Conservation Society' (WDCS).

References

External links
 2008 profile
 2005 profile
 Moby Dick Big Read
 The Whale blogsite

1958 births
English male non-fiction writers
English non-fiction writers
People educated at St Mary's College, Southampton
Writers from Southampton
Living people
Date of birth missing (living people)
Academics of the University of Southampton
Alumni of St Mary's University, Twickenham